HZ-2 is a drug which acts as a highly selective κ-opioid agonist. It is a potent analgesic with around the same potency as morphine, with a long duration of action and high oral bioavailability. Side effects include sedation, nausea and dysphoria as well as diuretic effects.

References 

Dissociative drugs
2-Pyridyl compounds
Carboxylate esters
Kappa-opioid receptor agonists